Nghi Lộc is a rural district of Nghệ An province in the North Central Coast region of Vietnam. As of 2003 the district had a population of 214,209. The district covers an area of 369 km². The district capital lies at Quán Hành.

Modern Nghi Diên village is the site of the old Xã Đoài Catholic Grand Seminary, and of the Xã Đoài orange.

References

Districts of Nghệ An province